The Department of Transport was an Australian government department that existed between December 1993 and March 1996. It was the fifth department to be given the name.

Scope
Information about the department's functions and/or government funding allocation could be found in the Administrative Arrangements Orders, the annual Portfolio Budget Statements and in the department's annual reports.

According to the Administrative Arrangements Order (AAO) made on 15 December 1993, the department dealt with:
Shipping and marine navigation
Land transport (including road safety)
Civil aviation and air navigation
Aviation security

Structure
The department was an Australian Public Service department responsible to the Minister for Transport, Laurie Brereton. Department officials were headed by a Secretary, initially Graham Evans (until his retirement on 20 February 1995), and then Peter Core.

References

Transport
Government agencies disestablished in 1996
1993 establishments in Australia
1996 disestablishments in Australia
Ministries established in 1993
Transport in Australia
Defunct transport organisations based in Australia